Set Sail the Prairie is the name of Kaddisfly's third full-length album, released on March 6, 2007.  The album has fourteen tracks. Each song represents both a month of the year and a specific location in the northern hemisphere. There are also two extra tracks for the summer and winter solstices. An unfinished version was leaked in June 2006, 9 months prior the release date.

Track listing
"Summer Solstice" – 1:32
"Campfire (Junio)" – 4:43
"Waves (July)" – 4:37
"Harbor (Agosto)" – 4:35
"Birds (Septembre)" – 6:03
"Clouds (Heshvan)" – 3:41
"Empire (Noyabr')" – 4:25
"Winter Solstice" – 1:20
"Snowflakes (Desember)" – 7:48
"Via Rail (Janvier)" – 5:23
"Silk Road (Pharvarì)" – 5:27
"Mercury (Sān Yuè)" – 5:07
"Clockwork (Sì Yuè)" – 3:46
"Forest (Maй)" – 11:13

Charts

References

2007 albums